Harlösa IF is a Swedish football club located in Harlösa

External links
Official site 

Football clubs in Skåne County